Mohammad Islam Khan (1957–2010) was an Indian glycobiologist and a scientist at the National Chemical Laboratory. Known for his studies on the biology of Lectins, Khan was an elected fellow of the National Academy of Sciences, India, Maharashtra Academy of Sciences and the Muslim Association for the Advancement of Science. The Department of Biotechnology of the Government of India awarded him the National Bioscience Award for Career Development, one of the highest Indian science awards, for his contributions to biosciences in 2002.

Biography 

Born on the Christmas eve of 1957, Mohammad Islam Khan obtained an MSc in biotechnology in 1978 and joined the Indian Institute of Chemical Biology (IICB) as a faculty, simultaneously doing his doctoral research at the Indian Institute of Science which earned him a PhD in 1986 from Aligarh Muslim University. Moving to the US, he did his post-doctoral work at Albert Einstein College of Medicine during 1987–90 and on his return to India in 1990, he joined the National Chemical Laboratory (NCL) as a scientist where he spent the rest of his career, barring a stint at the University of Göttingen during 2000–01 as an overseas associate of the Department of Biotechnology. He was holding the post of a scientist at the Division of Biochemical Sciences of NCL when he died in November 2010, aged 53.

Legacy 
Khan was known for his contributions in the disciplines of glycobiology and nanobiotechnology with special focus on the biology of lectins. His work was known to have assisted in widening our understanding of cell adhesion. He demonstrated the role of yeast cell surface lectins in the adhesion of yeast cells which is also known as flocculation. He isolated Fusarium sporotrichioides from rose plant which has since been deposited by him at the National Collection of Industrial Microorganisms (NCIM), a government-funded microbial culture repository based at NCL. The research team under his leadership was successful in isolating a peptide from Streptomyces that showed potency as an inhibitor of Cysteine proteases and the finding is reported to have use in the prophylaxis of cancer by preventing the migration of cancer cells. Towards the latter part of his career, he worked on the synthesis of metal‑metal sulphides/metal oxide nanoparticles using fungi and it was reported that the team synthesized the nano-particles outside a cell for the first time. His studies have been documented by way of a number of articles and PubMed, an online article repository of scientific articles has listed several of them.

Awards and honors 
The Indian National Science Academy awarded Khan the INSA Young Scientist Medal in 1987. Five years later, he received the 1992 Young Scientist Award of the Council of Scientific and Industrial Research. The Department of Biotechnology of the Government of India awarded him the National Bioscience Award for Career Development, one of the highest Indian science awards in 2002. He also received the elected fellowships from three Indian science academies namely, the National Academy of Sciences, India, Muslim Association for the Advancement of Science and Maharashtra Academy of Sciences.

Selected bibliography

See also 

 Nanoparticles
 Flocculation

Notes

References

External links 
 
 
 

N-BIOS Prize recipients
Indian scientific authors
Indian molecular biologists
Fellows of The National Academy of Sciences, India
Scientists from Pune
Indian Institute of Science alumni
Aligarh Muslim University alumni
Albert Einstein College of Medicine alumni
University of Göttingen
1957 births
2010 deaths
Indian biochemists